Martinus Abraham Burger (born 1 November 1993) is a South African rugby union player for the  in the Pro14. His regular position is lock or flanker.

Career

Youth and Varsity Cup rugby

At the primary school level, he was selected for the  side that played at the Under-13 Craven Week competition in 2006.

Burger then went to Grey College in Bloemfontein, which is in  territory. He represented them at the Under-18 Academy Week in 2011 and also played for the  side in the 2011 Under-19 Provincial Championship. In 2012, he started off playing for the U19s in the 2012 Under-19 Provincial Championship, but halfway through the season, he was promoted to the  side and started six matches for them in the 2012 Under-21 Provincial Championship.

Burger once again played for them in the 2013 Under-21 Provincial Championship, scoring five tries in seven starts, including a brace in their match against .

Free State Cheetahs

Burger made his first class debut during the 2014 Vodacom Cup competition. He also started their final match in the competition against the  a week later as they lost 21–22 in Bloemfontein.

References

1993 births
Living people
People from Dihlabeng Local Municipality
White South African people
South African rugby union players
Rugby union locks
Rugby union flankers
Free State Cheetahs players
Southern Kings players
Cheetahs (rugby union) players
Rouen Normandie Rugby players
Rugby union players from the Free State (province)